The Giorgio de Chirico House Museum (Casa Museo di Giorgio de Chirico) is a house museum in the 16th century Palazzetto del Borgognoni at Piazza di Spagna 31 in Rome. The house was acquired by Giorgio de Chirico in 1948. It was left to the state by his widow and opened as an art museum dedicated to his work in 1998. Only open by appointment, it is closed on Mondays and Sundays. The nearest Metro stop is Spagna.

Exhibits
It houses several works belonging to the Giorgio e Isa De Chirico Foundation, including:
Interno metafisico con nudo anatomico, 1968
Il meditatore, 1971
Sole su cavalletto, 1972
Due cavalli in riva al mare, 1964
Autoritratto di De Chirico, 1953
Donna in riposo, 1936
Naiadi al bagno, 1955
Riposo del Gladiatore, 1968
Orfeo trovatore stanco, 1970
Ritratto di Isa con testa di Minerva, 1944
Bagnanti, 1945
Frutta con busto di Apollo, 1973
Interno metafisico con biscotti, 1968
Il rimorso di Oreste, 1969
Bagni misteriosi, 1973
L'anniversario del principe, 1973
Triangolo metafisico, 1958
Pianto d'amore (Ettore e Andromaca), 1974
Le maschere, 1973

See also
 List of single-artist museums

Notes

External links
Fondazione De Chirico.
 

Art museums and galleries in Rome
Biographical museums in Italy
Historic house museums in Italy
Art museums established in 1998
1998 establishments in Italy
Giorgio de Chirico
Museums devoted to one artist